This is a list of schools in Sai Kung District, Hong Kong.

Secondary schools

 Government
  (將軍澳官立中學)

 Aided
 C&MA Sun Kei Secondary School (基督教宣道會宣基中學)
 Carmel Divine Grace Foundation Secondary School (迦密主恩中學)
 Catholic Ming Yuen Secondary School (天主教鳴遠中學)
 Cheng Chek Chee Secondary School of Sai Kung & Hang Hau District, N.T. (新界西貢坑口區鄭植之中學)
 HHCKLA Buddhist Ching Kok Secondary School (香海正覺蓮社佛教正覺中學)
 HK and Macau Lu Ch Queen Maud Secondary School (港澳信義會慕德中學)
 HKTA The Yuan Yuen Institute No. 3 Secondary School (香港道教聯合會圓玄學院第三中學)
 King Ling College (景嶺書院)
 MKMCF Ma Chan Duen Hey Memprial College (馬錦明慈善基金馬陳端喜紀念中學)
 PLK Ho Yuk Ching (1984) College (保良局甲子何玉清中學)
 Po Kok Secondary School (寶覺中學)
 POH 80th Anniversary Tang Ying Hei College (博愛醫院八十週年鄧英喜中學)
 Sai Kung Sun Tsun Catholic School (Secondary Section) (西貢崇真天主教學校（中學部）)
 STFA Cheng Yu Tung Secondary School (順德聯誼總會鄭裕彤中學)
 TWGH Lui Yun Choy Memorial College (東華三院呂潤財紀念中學))
 Wellington Educational Organisation Chang Pui Choy Memorial Secondary School (威靈頓教育機構張沛松紀念中學)
 YCH Lan Chi Pat Memorial Secondary School (仁濟醫院靚次伯紀念中學)
 YCH Wong Sha San Secondary School (仁濟醫院王華湘中學)

 Direct Subsidy Scheme
 Creative Secondary School (啓思中學)
 Evangel College 
 G. T. (Ellen Yeung) College (優才（楊殷有娣）書院)
 Heung To Sec School (將軍澳香島中學)
 HKCCC Union Logos Academy (香港華人基督教聯會真道書院)
 Man Kwan Qualied College (萬鈞匯知中學)
 Po Leung Kuk Laws Foundation College (保良局羅氏基金中學)

 Private
 French International School of Hong Kong Tseung Kwan O Campus
 Hong Kong Academy (香港學堂國際學校)
 Hong Kong Adventist Academy (香港復臨學校)
 MKMCF Ma Chan Duen Hey Memorial Evening College (馬錦明慈善基金馬陳端喜紀念夜校)
 Rudolf Steiner Education Foundation Hong Kong Maria College (香港華德福教育基金會瑪利亞書院)

Primary schools

 Government
 Tseung Kwan O Government Primary School (將軍澳官立小學)

 Aided
 Assembly of God Leung Sing Tak Primary School (基督教神召會梁省德小學)
 Chi Lin Buddhist Primary School (佛教志蓮小學)
 CHR & Missionary Alliance Sun Kei Primary School (基督教宣道會宣基小學)
 HHCKLA Buddhist Wong Cho Sum School (香海正覺蓮社佛教黃藻森學校)
 HK & Macau Lutheran Church Ming Tao Primary School (港澳信義會明道小學)
 HK & Macau Lutheran Church Primary School (港澳信義會小學)
 King Lam Catholic Primary School (景林天主教小學)
 Lok Sin Tong Lau Tak Primary School (樂善堂劉德學校)
 PLK Fung Ching Memorial Primary School (保良局馮晴紀念小學)
 PLK Wong Wing Shu Primary School (保良局黃永樹小學)
 Pok Oi Hospital Chan Kwok Wai Primary School (博愛醫院陳國威小學)
 S.K.H. Tseung Kwan O Kei Tak Primary School (聖公會將軍澳基德小學)
 Sai Kung Central Lee Siu Yam Memorial School (西貢中心李少欽紀念學校)
 Sai Kung Sung Tsun Catholic School (Primary Section (西貢崇真天主教學校（小學部）)
 St Andrew's Catholic Primary School (天主教聖安德肋小學)
 STFA Leung Kit Wah Primary School (順德聯誼總會梁潔華小學)
 Tseung Kwan O Catholic Primary School (將軍澳天主教小學)
 Tseung Kwan O Methodist Primary School (將軍澳循道衛理小學)
 TWGH Wong Yee Jar Jat Memorial Primary School (東華三院王余家潔紀念小學)
 Yan Oi Tong Tin Ka Ping Primary School (仁愛堂田家炳小學)
 YCH Chan Iu Seng Primary School (仁濟醫院陳耀星小學)

 Direct Subsidy Scheme
 Evangel College (播道書院)
 G. T. (Ellen Yeung) College (優才（楊殷有娣）書院)
 HKCCC Union Logos Academy (香港華人基督教聯會真道書院)
 PLK Luk Hing Too Primary School (保良局陸慶濤小學)

 English Schools Foundation
 Clearwater Bay School

 Private
 Forest House Waldorf School (樹宏學校)
 French International School of Hong Kong Tseung Kwan O Campus
 Hong Kong Academy
 Hong Kong Adventist Academy (香港復臨學校)
 Invictus School
 Shrewsbury International School Hong Kong (思貝禮國際學校)

Special schools

 Aided
 Haven of Hope Sunnyside School (靈實恩光學校)
 Hong Chi Morninghill School, Tsui Lam (匡智翠林晨崗學校)
 Hong Kong Red Cross Hospital Schools Tseung Kwan O Hospital (香港紅十字會醫院學校)
 Tseung Kwan O Pui Chi School (將軍澳培智學校)

References

Lists of schools in Hong Kong
Sai Kung District